Doryteuthis is a genus of squid from the waters of the western Atlantic and eastern Pacific off the coast of the Americas species are the common inshore squids of American waters. Some species are important quarry species for fisheries.

In Doryteuthis the tentacular clubs are expanded and bear suckers in 4 series. The hectocotylus is on the left ventral arm IV with unmodified suckers near the base, lack of a ventral crest while the reduced on elongated stalks form papillae on the dorsal series or on both dorsal and ventral series. The fins are situated in a posterior position. The spermatophore has a short, cement body cement body and they do not have any photophores.

Taxonomy
Doryteuthis is divided into two subgenera, Amerigo and Doryteuthis. The species in each subgenus are:

 Subgenus Amerigo
 Doryteuthis gahi (d'Orbigny, 1835) Patagonian squid
 Doryteuthis ocula (Cohen, 1976) bigeye inshore squid
 Doryteuthis opalescens (Berry, 1911) opalescent inshore squid
 Doryteuthis pealeii (Lesueur, 1821) longfin inshore squid
 Doryteuthis surinamensis (Voss, 1974) Surinam squid
 Subgenus Doryteuthis
 Doryteuthis plei (Blainville, 1823) slender inshore squid
 Doryteuthis roperi (Cohen, 1976) Island inshore squid
 Doryteuthis sanpaulensis (Brakoniecki, 1984) São Paulo squid

References

Cephalopod genera
Squid
Taxa named by Adolf Naef